The School of Conservation and Restoration of the Cultural Property of Galicia (ESCRBBCCG) is a Spanish higher education institution of the Ministry of Culture and Education of the Xunta de Galicia. It is located in Pontevedra, in the former Saint Ferdinand Barracks, in the same building as the Faculty of Fine Arts. It is the only Higher School of Conservation and Restoration of Cultural Heritage in Galicia and the northwest of Spain and is the second oldest restoration school in Spain.

Location 
The building is located at 1, General Martitegui Street in Pontevedra.

History 
The school has been offering conservation and restoration studies since 12 January 1992. It awards the Higher Diploma in Conservation and Restoration of Heritage and Cultural Property. The creation of the Higher School of Conservation and Restoration of Cultural Property of Galicia in Pontevedra dates back to 1991 with Decree 352/1991 of 17 October (DOG (Official Galician Journal) of 24 October).

Between December 1994 and January 1995, the renovation of the building intended to house the Galician Higher School of Cultural Heritage was completed. In 1995, the school, created in 1991, moved in.

The training 
The school delivers the Higher Degree in Conservation and Restoration of Heritage and Cultural Property. The studies last four years, the first two years being common and the last two years being specialised. The three specialities taught in this institution are conservation-restoration of sculptural assets, conservation-restoration of pictorial assets and conservation-restoration of archaeological assets.

The first two years of study focus on conservation and restoration techniques, with a study of biology, physics and chemistry related to restoration and art history. In the final two years, there is a specialisation according to the option chosen, in which the technique and theory of each section are studied in depth.

Admission of cultural heritage conservators 
The school is public and requires a high school degree and a specific admission exam. The exam consists of two parts: a textual analysis (related to the school's subjects) and a plastic arts exam (for example, that a colour is degraded in three phases using white).

Facilities 
The large building of the school is the former neoclassical Saint Ferdinand Barracks, designed by the architect Bonifacio Menéndez Conde, built between 1906 and 1909 and renovated in 1994 by the architect César Portela Fernández-Jardón to become the headquarters of the higher school for the Conservation and Restoration of Cultural Property in Galicia.

The institution's library has more than 9,000 volumes, of which almost 6,000 were donated in July 2020 by the heirs of the doctor Manuel Carballal Lugrís, who lived in Pontevedra.

Gallery

References

See also

Related articles 
 Faculty of Fine Arts of Pontevedra
 Xunta de Galicia

External links 
 Official ESCRBBCCG website

Arts in Spain
Art schools in Spain
Organizations established in 1991
Cultural heritage conservation
Conservation and restoration of cultural heritage
Pontevedra Campus
Universities and colleges in Spain